The R29 was a New York City Subway car model built by the St. Louis Car Company in 1962 for the IRT A Division. A total of 236 cars were built, arranged in married pairs.

The R29s entered service on April 28, 1962, and received air conditioning by 1982. The fleet was rebuilt by Morrison–Knudsen between 1985 and 1987. The R29s were replaced in 2001 & 2002 with the delivery of the R142 and R142A cars, with the last train running on October 24, 2002. After being retired, most R29s were sunk into the ocean as artificial reefs, but two cars have survived.

Description 
The R29s were numbered 8570–8805. Between 1985 and 1987, the R29s were overhauled under contract R99. Therefore, the cars are also known as R99s in their post-overhaul state.

The R29s are very similar to appearance to the R26s and R28s, with the exceptions that they were built by a different company and permanently paired with link bars (instead of couplers).

The R29s were split into two sub groups: 
 Cars 8570–8687 had Westinghouse electrical equipment 
 Cars 8688–8805 had General Electric electrical equipment.

The R29s wore several paint schemes during their service lives. They were the first subway cars to feature a bright red paint scheme since the R17s. In 1970–1975 the R29s were repainted into the MTA corporate silver and blue scheme. In 1982–1983 the R29s were repainted full white (roof, bonnets, sides were all painted white) in attempt to combat graffiti. During rebuilding by Morrison–Knudsen at Hornell, New York from 1985 to 1987 the R29s were repainted into Redbirds with a deep maroon red body, black front bonnets and anti-climbers, and a silver roof.

Four cars (pairs 8686–8687 and 8804–8805) were tested with G70 trucks. The use of these trucks was discontinued in 1970.

History

Early history
The first set of R29s debuted on the  service on April 28, 1962. After initial in-service testing, the first train of R29s (8570–8579) operated on  service as a special 10-car train on April 29, 1962. On May 1 of that year, it was transferred to the  service. The original intention was to assign all of these cars to the  service, while transferring the existing R12 and R14 cars on the line to the mainline IRT services to begin replacing their existing Low-Voltage cars, many of which were approaching 50 years of age at the time. However, plans had changed, and it was decided to order new R33S single cars and R36WF married pair cars to completely re-equip the  service in time for the new 1964–5 World's Fair exhibition in Flushing instead; these cars were also ordered during 1962.

Late 1960s–Mid 1980s
A year later in February 1967 Westinghouse cars 8570–8599 were reassigned to the  being displaced by R12s 5707–5729 coming back from work service.

Rebuilding
By 1982, all R29s received air conditioning as part of a retrofitting program to replace the cars' original Axiflow ceiling fans.

The R29s were rebuilt by Morrison–Knudsen in Hornell, New York as Redbirds between 1985 and 1987 under the R99 retrofitting program. 
Unlike the R26s and R28s, the R29s retained their original propulsion equipment after being rebuilt.

In June 1985 the first 10 GE R29s were removed from service to be sent to Morrison–Knudsen in Hornell, New York for rebuilding. After being rebuilt the cars returned to MTA property in September 1985. By June 10, 1986 all rebuilt GE cars were in service except for mis-mated pair 8702–8723 which did not return from rebuilding until all cars were rebuilt.

The first pair of Westinghouse R29s which were cars 8660–8661 were removed from service by the end of February 1986 to be sent to Morrison–Knudsen in Hornell, New York for rebuilding along with the last unrebuilt GE cars. From April to early May 1986 with the arrival of the then new R62As on the  half of the Westinghouse R29s assigned to that route were displaced to the  paving the way for Westinghouse cars 8570–8599 already assigned there to be sent for rebuilding beginning at the end of May.

By the end of June 1986 8 more rebuilt Westinghouse R29s entered service on the  joining the first rebuilt Westinghouse pair already there.

By May 6, 1987 all rebuilt Westinghouse cars were in service. By October 22, 1987 all rebuilt cars were in service.

Retirement
In 1996, New York City Transit Authority announced their plans to phase out the Redbirds with the R142 and R142A fleets.

The last train, consisting of pairs 8708–8709, 8716–8717, 8718–8719, 8784–8785 and 8786–8787, made their final trip on the 5 on October 24, 2002.

As the R29 cars were being retired, some were used in work service, including pairs 8600–8601 and 8634–8635, which were used for signal dolly service in 2001, and cars 8716–8719, which were used in 2002 for transporting one of three Rail Adhesion Cars throughout the system (R33 8885). These pairs of cars were later reefed.

After retirement, all but one pair was stripped of all parts and sunk into the Atlantic Ocean to create artificial reefs. Today, cars 8678–8679 are the only surviving R29s. This pair was retained for work service and stored at the Unionport Yard until July 2013, when the pair was moved to Concourse Yard for storage, along with R26s 7774–7775 and R28s 7924–7925.

References

Train-related introductions in 1962
St. Louis multiple units
R029